Jean Morel Poé (born 15 December 1996) is an Ivorian footballer who plays as a right winger for Kryvbas Kryvyi Rih on loan from Ismaily.

Career
In January 2023 he signed for Kryvbas Kryvyi Rih.

Honours
ASEC Mimosas
 Côte d'Ivoire Premier Division: 2018
 Côte d'Ivoire Cup: 2018

References

External links

 

1996 births
Living people
People from Bingerville
Ivorian footballers
Ivory Coast international footballers
Association football forwards
ASEC Mimosas players
FC Torpedo-BelAZ Zhodino players
FC Smolevichi players
FC Neman Grodno players
FC Dinamo Minsk players
Ismaily SC players
FC Kryvbas Kryvyi Rih players
Ivorian expatriate footballers
Expatriate footballers in Belarus
Ivorian expatriate sportspeople in Belarus
Expatriate footballers in Egypt
Ivorian expatriate sportspeople in Egypt
Expatriate footballers in Ukraine
Ivorian expatriate sportspeople in Ukraine